The electoral district of Algester is an electoral district of the Legislative Assembly of Queensland in south-west Brisbane. It includes the suburbs of Algester, Parkinson, Hillcrest, Boronia Heights, Forestdale, Larapinta, Heathwood, Forest Lake, Doolandella and Pallara, as well as the Greenbank Military Range. It borders the electoral districts of Sunnybank, Stretton, Logan, Lockyer, Bundamba and Inala.

The Algester electoral district was created at the 1999 redistribution from the former electoral district of Archerfield, and was contested for the first time at the 2001 election. It had been a safe seat for the Labor Party since its inception, as had Archerfield, but it was won by Anthony Shorten of the Liberal National Party at the 2012 election. Leeanne Enoch won the seat back for Labor at the 2015 election. Enoch is the first Indigenous Australian woman elected to the Queensland parliament.

Members for Algester

Election results

References

Algester